Sara Elena Ramírez (born August 31, 1975) is a Mexican-American actor and singer. Born in Mazatlán, Sinaloa, Ramírez moved to the United States at eight years old, eventually graduating with a fine arts degree from the Juilliard School.

Ramírez began acting in Broadway productions, making their debut in Paul Simon's The Capeman, and later ventured into film and television roles. Ramírez's breakthrough came with their portrayal of the original Lady of the Lake in the 2005 Broadway musical Spamalot, winning the Tony Award for Best Featured Actress in a Musical. Ramírez was offered to pick their own primetime television show in an array of ABC lineups, choosing Grey's Anatomy. They portrayed Dr. Callie Torres, one of the longest-running LGBT characters in US television history, appearing in 11 seasons and 239 episodes. Ramírez's volunteered addition of the character's bisexuality marked one of the earliest series regular queer roles on primetime television. After departing from the series, Ramirez came out as bisexual and later non-binary, using they/them pronouns. They later portrayed the bisexual, non-binary roles of Kat Sandoval in Madam Secretary and Che Díaz in And Just Like That..., respectively.
 
Ramirez debuted as a voice actor in the 1999 video game entitled Um Jammer Lammy, and has voiced Queen Miranda in the animated series Sofia the First (2012–2018). Ramírez released their first single "Silent Night" in 2009. Their self-titled EP debuted at no. 37 on the Billboard 200 in 2011.

Ramírez's extensive campaigns for LGBT rights won the Ally for Equality Award from the Human Rights Campaign Foundation in 2015. Ramírez has also been the recipient of a Tony Award, a Screen Actors Guild Award, and a Satellite Award, among other accolades.

Early life
Ramírez was born on August 31, 1975, in Mazatlán, Sinaloa in northwestern Mexico. Ramírez's father and mother are Mexican. When Ramírez was eight years old, their parents divorced, and Ramírez went to live with their mother, eventually settling in Tierrasanta, San Diego, California. Ramírez's interest in music encouraged their mother to send them to San Diego School of Creative and Performing Arts, where their singing talent was discovered during an audition. Ramírez started acting in stage productions in high school.

After having played such roles as the Witch in Into the Woods, Dolly in Hello, Dolly! and Miss Hannigan in Annie, Ramírez was recommended for the Juilliard School, New York City, from which they graduated with a Bachelor in Fine Arts (dramatics). At Juilliard, Ramírez further worked on their acting skills and trained as a vocalist. Ramírez speaks both Spanish and English fluently.

Career

Broadway breakthrough and other roles (1998–2005)
While still at Juilliard, Ramírez was discovered by a casting director and was offered the role of Wahzinak in Paul Simon's 1998 Broadway musical The Capeman. Based on the life of the Puerto Rican gangster Salvador Agron, the production garnered negative reviews, but Ramirez was singled out for their "outstanding" performance. They made their screen debut in the same year, with a minor yet "memorable" role in the romantic comedy You've Got Mail. Starring Tom Hanks and Meg Ryan, the film had Ramírez play Rose, a Zabar's cashier who was "very serious about her line's cash-only policy." Ramirez voiced the titular character of Lammy in the video game UmJammer Lammy, a spin-off of PaRappa the Rapper, on Sony's PlayStation console. They later reprised their role in the latter's sequel for PlayStation 2, but had a smaller role.

In 1999, Ramírez appeared in Mark Lamos' The Gershwins' Fascinating Rhythm (1999). They garnered praise for their performance and received an Outer Critics Circle Award nomination for their role. Charles Isherwood of Variety praised their "beautiful, smoky voice" but was critical of their "torchy" performance of "The Man I Love," which ignored "the wry irony that infuses Ira's lyrics". Ramirez then appeared in the 2001 Broadway production of Edward Kleban's A Class Act. They replaced Julia Murney (from the off-Broadway) to play the role of Felecia, the protagonist Ed's boss. The same year, they starred in other productions including Fascinating Rhythm and Dreamgirls, and then performed in the 2002 production of The Vagina Monologues with Tovah Feldshuh and Suzanne Bertish. During this time, Ramírez also appeared in guest roles in several television series, including  NYPD Blue, Law & Order: SVU, Third Watch, and Spin City among others.

Ramírez's breakout role came upon being cast as the Lady of the Lake in Eric Idle and John Du Prez's musical Spamalot. Based on the 1975 film Monty Python and the Holy Grail, the musical opened on Broadway in 2005 to widespread acclaim. Ramírez was singled out for their performance, winning several awards including the 2005 Tony Award for Best Featured Actress in a Musical and the Drama League Award for Distinguished Performance. Ben Brantley of The New York Times described them as "a toothsome devourer of scenery", and another reviewer for The Playgoer emphasizing their stage presence remarked that their "intensity is totally serious and totally ludicrous and totally on key". An Entertainment Weekly review gave them the highest praise by calling them a show-stealer.

Grey's Anatomy and other projects (2006–2021)
After success on Broadway, Ramírez joined the cast of the ABC medical drama Grey's Anatomy in a recurring role as Dr. Calliope 'Callie' Torres, a love interest for Dr. George O'Malley, in the show's second season. On a special Grey's Anatomy-themed episode of The Oprah Winfrey Show, Ramírez revealed that top executives from ABC, who were greatly impressed by their performance in Spamalot, offered them a role in any ABC show they wanted. Ramírez picked Grey's, as they were already a fan of the show.  Ramírez further explained that at their initial audition, the producers liked them and intended to add them to the show but did not know who to cast them as. Ramírez also said they were in awe of how the executives said, "Pick a show, any show," explaining that it is rare. The series creator and executive producer, Shonda Rhimes explained, "I was looking for a girlfriend for George, but it was in the infancy stages, so I had no idea what I was looking for." Rhimes built the character around Ramírez after Rhimes met them. Ramírez, who was initially given a recurring status at the time of the character's inception, received a star billing in the show's third season, alongside fellow cast member Eric Dane, who portrayed Dr. Mark Sloan.

Ramírez provided a cappella vocals in the song "Silent Night" for the soundtrack of the show's sixth-season episode "Holidaze," airing on November 19, 2009.  Ramirez served as the main vocalist for the musical episode of Grey's Anatomy, "Song Beneath the Song", which aired on March 31, 2011. Marcus James Dixon of Gold Derby called them the "show-stopper" and wrote that they "stole the show in a gut-wrenching performance worthy of an Emmy award."

As the series progressed, the character's popularity soared and Ramírez garnered widespread recognition and critical acclaim for their portrayal of a complex character on television. Maggie Fremont, a TV critic for Vulture, reviewed Ramírez and Jessica Capshaw's performances during an 11th season episode, calling them "goddesses walking amongst mere mortals".  Ramírez was nominated for Outstanding Actress in a Drama Television Series at the Alma Awards in 2007 and 2008. Also in 2007, at the 13th Screen Actors Guild Awards, the cast of Grey's Anatomy received the Award for Outstanding Performance by an Ensemble in a Drama Series. They and the cast were nominated for the same award in 2008. In 2011, at the 42nd NAACP Image Awards, Ramírez was nominated for Outstanding Supporting Actress in a Drama Series.

In May 2016, Ramírez left the show at the conclusion of the 12th season, after having played the character for a decade. They released a statement saying, "I'm deeply grateful to have spent the last 10 years with my family at Grey's Anatomy and ABC, but for now I'm taking some welcome time off." Rhimes wrote of Ramírez's work on the show, "Dr. Callie Torres came into our lives dancing it out in her underwear almost a decade ago, and I could not be happier or more proud of her journey. Sara Ramírez's performance inspired me as well as millions of fans each week."

Ramírez turned producer with the 2016 teen comedy film, Loserville. The project was released in partnership with the Pacer Foundation's Center for Bullying Prevention & Stomp Out Bullying.

From 2017 to 2019, Ramírez co-starred in the fourth and fifth seasons of the CBS political drama Madam Secretary, replacing Bebe Neuwirth, who played Nadine Tolliver. They played Kat Sandoval, the new policy advisor of Secretary Elizabeth McCord (Téa Leoni).

In 2021, Ramírez was cast as non-binary podcast host and comedian Che Díaz in the Sex and the City revival series And Just Like That.... The character of Che has received mixed to negative reviews.

Personal life

On June 27, 2011, Ramírez got engaged to longtime boyfriend Ryan DeBolt, a business analyst at TIMEC in Paris, France. They were married on July 4, 2012, in a private beachside ceremony in New York. On July 6, 2021, Ramirez announced in an Instagram post that they had separated from DeBolt.

In September 2016, Ramírez donated their hair to Locks of Love, an organization that makes wigs for children who suffer from medical conditions that lead to hair loss. Afterward, they sported a buzz cut, styled as an undercut.

In October 2016, Ramírez described themself as queer and bisexual at the True Colors Fund's 40 To None Summit (now known as the Impact Summit) in Los Angeles, California. In an email to the Huffington Post, they wrote that their decision to come out publicly was a "very organic and natural" one. In August 2020, Ramirez said they had recently determined they identify as nonbinary and used she/they pronouns, which were changed to they/them sometime in 2021.

Off-screen work

Singing career
Ramírez released their first single, a rendition of Silent Night, in 2009. The song was featured in the tenth episode of the sixth season of Grey's Anatomy. Their debut, self-titled, extended play came out in March 2011 on the iTunes Store under the label of Atrevida Records. The EP included four songs, including a cover of "The Story", which was originally recorded by Brandi Carlile in her 2007 album. Two of the three songs were co-written by Ramirez and the album's writer-producer Rob Giles. Sara Ramirez debuted at number 37 on the Billboard 200, number nine on Billboard Independent Albums chart, and number 38 on the Canadian Albums Chart. "The Story" debuted the same week at number 69 on the Billboard Hot 100, number 72 on the Canadian Hot 100, and number 34 on the Irish Singles Chart. Soundtracks for Monty Python's Spamalot (Original Broadway Cast Recording) (2005) and Grey's Anatomy: The Music Event (2011) were released under the labels of Decca Records and ABC Studios respectively.

Philanthropy
Ramírez is an activist and extensively campaigns for LGBT rights. They are a member of the True Colors United board of directors and The Task Force, and the San Diego, New York, and San Francisco LGBT Centers. They spoke in support of homeless LGBTQ youth at a True Colors Fund conference. In addition, Ramirez supports other groups including BiNetUSA, Bisexual Organizing Project, American Institute of Bisexuality, NDLON, and Mujeres De Maíz. In 2015, they were awarded the Ally for Equality Award by the Human Rights Campaign Foundation.

Filmography and awards

Accolades
Ramírez won the Tony Award for Best Performance by a Featured Actress in a Musical and the Outstanding Featured Actress in a Musical for their role in the 2005 Broadway musical Spamalot. They gained widespread acclaim for their portrayal of Dr. Callie Torres in ABC's medical drama Grey's Anatomy. They garnered nominations for the Best Actress at the NAACP Image Award, the ALMA Award, and won the Screen Actors Guild Award for Outstanding Performance by an Ensemble in a Drama Series.

Discography

Extended plays

Singles
 "Silent Night" (2009)
 "Rollercoaster" (2015)

Soundtracks

References

Notes

External links

 
 
 

1975 births
Living people
20th-century American actors
20th-century Mexican actors
21st-century American actors
21st-century Mexican actors
Actors from San Diego
Actors from Sinaloa
American actors of Mexican descent
American contraltos
American film actors
American musical theatre actors
American non-binary actors
American people of Irish descent
American stage actors
American television actors
American television personalities of Mexican descent
American video game actors
American voice actors
American bisexual actors
Bisexual musicians
Hispanic and Latino American singers
Juilliard School alumni
Mexican LGBT actors
LGBT Hispanic and Latino American people
Mexican LGBT rights activists
American LGBT singers
Mexican emigrants to the United States
Mexican film actors
Mexican musical theatre actors
Mexican people of Irish descent
Mexican stage actors
Mexican television actors
Musicians from San Diego
Non-binary activists
Non-binary musicians
People from Mazatlán
Queer people
Singer-songwriters from California
Tony Award winners
Bisexual non-binary people